Chittoor–Thatchur, newly numbered as NH716B, is a  planned and upcoming green field access controlled expressway in India. The expressway will be part of Bharatmala Pariyojana and will start at Keenatampalli near Chittoor and terminate at Thatchur near Ponneri Chennai.

Status updates
 Feb 2019: Farmers in some villages are opposing land acquisition.
 Aug 2020: The target date for completion of expressway is set as March 2024.

See also 
 Bangalore–Chennai Expressway

References 

Proposed expressways in India
Roads in Tamil Nadu
Expressways in Andhra Pradesh
Transport in Chittoor district